

Chairmen
John Houghton MHK, 2004–present
George Waft MLC, 1996–2004
Clare Christian MLC, 1981–1982
Noel Cringle MLC, 1992–1996
Walter Gilbey, years unknown

See also
Civil Service Commission

Government of the Isle of Man